Cafaggio is a village in Tuscany, central Italy, administratively a frazione of the comune of Prato, province of Prato.

Cafaggio is about 70 km from Prato.

References

Bibliography 
 

Frazioni of the Province of Prato